Four Mountains or Four Peaks variously interpreted from Chinese mythology or the most ancient level of Chinese history as being a person or four persons or four gods, depending upon the specific source. The ambiguous Four Mountains feature prominently in the myth of the Great Flood, and the related myths of Emperor Yao (in whose reign the Great Flood began), Gun, Shun (Yao's successor as emperor), and Yu the Great (who finally controlled the flood waters during the reign of Shun, and later succeeded him as emperor). 

Mythologist Yang Lihui sees Four Mountains as four gods of a set of four mountains, with Four Mountains referring to the actual mountains themselves. K. C. Wu sees Four Mountains as being a ministerial position established by Yao to "oversee the mundane affairs of the empire", but points out that a real description of the functions of this position is lacking, nor is it certain whether there were one or four persons holding this ministerial position; however, he goes on to say that the evidence suggests the existence of four of them, and that they were charged with keeping themselves knowledgeable about what was going on throughout Yao's domain and advising him upon request. The importance of Four Mountains can be seen in the key role of selecting Gun to be the first to be put in charge of controlling the flood, then, later, in nominating Shun to be Yao's co-emperor, and later successor. Anne Birrell says that Four Peaks (alternate term for Four Mountains) is a "synonym for [the] ruling nobility of the four quarters of the world in the archaic era; also four mountains" (Birrell 1993, 300).

Name
The name "Four Mountains" in Chinese uses 四 (sì), the standard character/word for the number four, plus 嶽 (yuè), which refers to a great mountain, or the highest peak of a mountain — in contrast to the usual word for mountain, 山 (shān), which may also be used to refer to a mere foothill or other geological prominence.

Cosmology
Anthony Christie relates the figure of Four Mountains to the Chinese cosmological idea of a square earth, with each of the peaks representing one of the four cardinal directions which the ruler would tour, and at which he would perform various imperial rituals, upon taking possession of his realm. The person or person(s) of Four Mountains being afterwards present in court then symbolized the completion of the ruler's having taken possession of his entire realm.

See also
Chinese mythological geography
Chinese mythology, a general article on Chinese mythology
List of mythological Chinese mountains
Sacred Mountains of China
Kunlun Mountain (mythology)
Xia dynasty

Notes

References

Bibliography
Birrell, Anne (1993). Chinese Mythology. (Baltimore: Johns Hopkins). 

Asia in mythology
Chinese gods
Locations in Chinese mythology
Mythological mountains